Küdürlü or Kyudyurlyu may refer to:
 Küdürlü, Agdam, Azerbaijan
 Küdürlü, Qakh, Azerbaijan
 Küdürlü, Shaki, Azerbaijan